Ding Yuan (died 26 September 189), courtesy name Jianyang, was a Chinese politician and warlord who lived during the late Eastern Han dynasty of China. In 189, both he and Dong Zhuo were summoned into the capital Luoyang with their individual troops to assist in the struggle against the powerful eunuch faction. Ding Yuan, however, was eventually killed by his trusted aide Lü Bu, who had been bought over by Dong Zhuo.

Life
According to the Records of Heroes (英雄記) by Wang Can, Ding Yuan was born in a poor family. Uncouth but brave, he was adept in horse riding and archery. During his early career as a county magistrate, he never turned away from his responsibility no matter the adversity or risk. He always pitched himself in front during confrontations with fugitive criminals and bandits. He was eventually promoted to Inspector of Bing Province (并州; present-day Shanxi) when he met Lü Bu. The martial prowess of the young warrior greatly impressed Ding Yuan, who made him Chief Secretary and kept him close at side.

In May 189, Emperor Ling died. The General-in-Chief He Jin then summoned Ding Yuan into the capital Luoyang with his regional troops to assist in the power struggle against the eunuch faction. Before Ding Yuan arrived, however, the eunuchs assassinated He Jin. Dong Zhuo, a warlord from Liang Province (涼州; present-day western Gansu) who was also summoned by He Jin, arrived in Luoyang ahead of Ding Yuan and defeated the eunuchs, grasping military control of the capital.

After Ding Yuan arrived, Dong Zhuo managed to buy over Lü Bu, who killed Ding Yuan and presented the latter's head to Dong Zhuo.

In Romance of the Three Kingdoms

The 14th-century historical novel Romance of the Three Kingdoms is a romanticisation of the events that occurred before and during the Three Kingdoms period of China. In Chapter 3, Ding Yuan becomes a rival of Dong Zhuo after he opposes the latter's plan to depose Emperor Shao in favour of Emperor Xian. However, Dong Zhuo refrains from killing Ding Yuan on the spot because Ding Yuan's foster son, the formidable warrior Lü Bu, is protecting him.

Li Su, an official under Dong Zhuo who is from the same commandery as Lü Bu, then volunteers to persuade Lü Bu to defect to Dong Zhuo's side. Bringing along a famous steed named Red Hare and other luscious gifts, he meets Lü Bu at his camp outside the city. Attracted by the gifts and feeling convinced by Li Su, Lü Bu agrees to betray his foster father and defect to Dong Zhuo's side. That very night, Lü Bu barges into Ding Yuan's tent, decapitates him and brings his head as a present to Dong Zhuo the following day.

See also
 Lists of people of the Three Kingdoms

References

 Chen, Shou (3rd century). Records of the Three Kingdoms (Sanguozhi).
 
 Fan, Ye (5th century). Book of the Later Han (Houhanshu).
 Luo, Guanzhong (14th century). Romance of the Three Kingdoms (Sanguo Yanyi).
 Pei, Songzhi (5th century). Annotations to Records of the Three Kingdoms (Sanguozhi zhu).

2nd-century births
189 deaths
Deaths by decapitation
Han dynasty politicians
Han dynasty warlords